Imagen Records is an American record label based in Washington D.C.

History 
Imagen Records is an independent record label featuring rock artists such as Framing Hanley, New Medicine, 3 Years Hollow, Candlelight Red, and Separations..  Founded in April 2007 by Bob Winegard, and based out of Washington, DC, Imagen Records has been able to establish an impressive roster of artists since its conception. Imagen Records’ Vice President and head of A&R, Morgan Rose, is the drummer for the heavy metal band Sevendust.  The label welcomes established artists as well as up and coming artists, and promises a partnership between artist and label as opposed to detachment between the two.  Imagen Records enjoys a strategic alliance with Alternative Distribution Alliance (ADA) who provides physical and digital global distribution of records as well as physical and merchandise production.

Current and former artists 
ALBORN
3 Years Hollow
Arnel Pineda 
Candlelight Red
Framing Hanley
Jela Cello
Lloyd Dobler Effect
Namesake
New Medicine
Peaches and Herb
Separations
The Lonely Ones
Bill Champlin
ARTIFAS

Discography 
Peaches and Herb - Colors of Love (May 8, 2009)
Candlelight Red - The Wreckage (January 1, 2011)
Candlelight Red - Demons EP (August 13, 2012)
Candlelight Red - Reclamation (June 4, 2013)
3 Years Hollow - The Cracks (February 11, 2014)
Framing Hanley - The Sum of Who We Are (April 29, 2014)
New Medicine - Breaking the Model - (August 26, 2014)
Separations - Dream Eater (October 2, 2015)
Jela Cello - Christmas Dreams (November 6, 2015)
Arnel Pineda - Sounds of Christmas (December 18, 2015)
Namesake - Borders & Fences Deluxe Edition (January 15, 2016)
Don't Believe in Ghosts - Solutions (May 14, 2021)

See also
 List of record labels: I–Q

References

External links

American record labels
Alternative rock record labels
Record labels established in 2007